Champawat (Kumaoni: Champāvat) is a town and a Nagar Palika Parishad in Champawat district in the state of Uttarakhand, India. It is the administrative headquarters of Champawat district. The town was the former capital of the Kumaon Kingdom.

Belief and religion

Champawat is believed to be the place where the Kurmavtar (the turtle incarnation of Lord Vishnu) took place. These days there is a temple called Kranteshwar Mandir, which is dedicated to lord Shiva. It is also believed that the head of Ghatotkacha  (son of Bhima  and the Rakshasi  Hidimbi ) fell here after he died in the battle of Mahabharata. The Gahtku Mandir is the temple dedicated to  Ghatotkacha. There is a famous temple called the Shani Mandir (or Manokamna Purn Mandir Kaula) in the village of Maurari

History
The original name of Champawat is said to be Champavati, which was due to its location on the banks of the Champavati stream. To the west of this region was a fort called Donkot, where the local Rawat kings resided. There are seven ancient temples in the valley of the Champavati stream: Baleshwar, Kranteshwar, Tadkeshwar, Rishneshwar, Dikteshwar, Mallareshwar and Maneshwar, of which, the Baleshwar temple is considered to be the most important. According to a local epic titled Gurupaduka, Champavati, the sister of the Nagas, did penance near the Baleshwar temple of Champawat. In her memory, the temple of Champavati is still located inside the Baleshwar temple complex. According to the Vayu Purana, Champavati was the capital of nine kings of Puri Naga Dynasty.

Champawat was formerly the capital of the Chand dynasty rulers of Kumaon. The Baleshwar Temple built by the Chand rulers in the 12th century is an excellent monument with marvelous stone carving works.

The Champawat Tiger, a man-eating tigress who killed in excess of four hundred people, was named after this town, as she operated primarily in its surrounding area. She was shot in 1907 by the famed hunter Jim Corbett, the first designated man-eater he killed in a 30 year long career.

Geography
Champawat lies in the southeast of the North Indian state of Uttarakhand. The city of Champawat lies in the Champawat district of Uttarakhand, which was carved out from the Pithoragarh district by the Government of Uttar Pradesh in 1997.

Tehsil 
Total No of Tehsil in Champawat District

 Pati
 Shri Poornagiri
 Champawat
 Lohaghat
 Barakot

Climate
Champawat has a Humid subtropical climate (Köppen climate classification Cfa) with distinct wet and dry seasons. Due to its high elevation, Champawat usually enjoys a more moderate climate throughout the year. There are an average of 43.8 days of precipitation, with the most precipitation occurring in August with 10.9 days and the least precipitation occurring in November with 0.6 days.

Tourism
Due to its cooler temperatures Champawat is a popular conduit for tourists visiting Pithoragarh, Dharchula, Almora and other mountain towns. The long winding sealed roads leading up to Champawat through Tanakpur are a popular route for motorcycle enthusiasts. Champawat has multiple hotels and guesthouses for individuals visiting the town. Bal Mithai of Champawat is famous for its unique taste. According to www.India.com, Champawat was ranked among ten most peaceful places in India. Many other non governmental organisations also ranked Champawat among ten most peaceful places in India

Demographics

Out of the total Population, 2,543 are males while 2,258 are females as per report released by Census India 2011.

Population of Children with age of 0–6 is 554 which is 11.54% of total population of Champawat. In Champawat, Female Sex Ratio is of 888 against state average of 963. Moreover, Child Sex Ratio in Champawat is around 748 compared to Uttarakhand state average of 890. Literacy rate of Champawat city is 91.69% higher than state average of 78.82%. The Male literacy is around 95.91% while female literacy rate is 87.04%.

Schedule Caste constitutes 18.60% while Schedule Tribe were 0.94% of total population in Champawat. Out of total population, 1,356 were engaged in work or business activity. Of this 1,103 were males while 253 were females. Of total 1356 working population, 95.28% were engaged in Main Work while 4.72% of total workers were engaged in Marginal Work.

Transport 
Champawat lies on the National Highway 9. The highway running from Malout in Punjab to Askot in uttarakhand connects Champawat with Delhi, Rudrapur, Tanakpur and Pithoragarh.

Popular modes of transport are shared taxis and buses run by Uttarakhand Transport Corporation and Kumaon Motor Owners Union, which connect Champawat to Delhi and other major cities in the state of Uttarakhand, such as Dehradun, Tanakpur, Haldwani, Pithoragarh, Almora and Rudrapur. The Champawat Bus Station, located in Shant Bazar locality of the town, was inaugurated on 27 Jan 2019.

Education 
As of 2011, there are eight primary schools, three middle schools, two secondary schools, two senior secondary schools / Inter colleges and one degree College in the town. The Govt. P.G. College, Champawat - the only degree college in the town was established in 1996, and was previously affiliated to Kumaun University, Nainital. The college, along with all other degree colleges of Champawat district got affiliated to Soban Singh Jeena University, Almora, when it was founded in 2020.

See also
 Advaita Ashrama
 Champawat Tiger
 Gurudwara Reetha Sahib

References

External links

 Champawat city, Official website
 Champwat website from Government of India Portal

 
Cities and towns in Champawat district
Hill stations in Uttarakhand
Former capital cities in India